Andreas Ziro (1910 – 1991) was a Greek sailor. He competed in the Star event at the 1952 Summer Olympics.

References

External links
 

1910 births
1991 deaths
Greek male sailors (sport)
Olympic sailors of Greece
Sailors at the 1952 Summer Olympics – Star
Place of birth missing